Kiril Raykov (born 15 May 1969) is a retired Bulgarian sprinter who specialized in the 400 metres.

He finished eighth in the 4 x 400 metres relay at the 1993 World Championships, with teammates Stanislav Georgiev, Tsvetoslav Stankulov and Anton Ivanov. He also competed at the 1988 World Junior Championships without reaching the final.

References 

1969 births
Living people
Bulgarian male sprinters